Anexotamos is a monotypic moth genus in the subfamily Lymantriinae. Its only species, Anexotamos flavibasis, is found in Uganda and Zaire. Both the genus and the species were first described by Hering in 1926.

References

Lymantriinae
Monotypic moth genera